Johnny Ray Cardenas is an American college baseball coach and former catcher. Cardenas is the head coach of the Stephen F. Austin Lumberjacks baseball team.

Amateur career
Cardenas attended Seward County Community College in Liberal, Kansas. Cardenas then accepted a scholarship to play at Texas Christian University (TCU), to play college baseball for the TCU Horned Frogs baseball team.

Professional career
Cardenas was drafted in the 46th round (1,271th overall) by the Seattle Mariners in the 1993 Major League Baseball draft.

Cardenas began his professional career with the Bellingham Mariners of the Class A-Short Season Northwest League, where he batted .204 with two home runs. He was promoted to the Riverside Pilots of the Class A-Advanced California League in 1994. He hit .208 with one home run for Riversite.

Cardenas played 1995 season with the Port City Roosters of the Class AA Southern League. In 1996, Cardenas began the season with Port City, after batting .189 with 1 home run and 6 RBIs in 27 games with Port City, he was released. He played the rest of the 1996 season with the Oklahoma City 89ers of the American Association.

He was released following the 1996 season and signed with the Duluth–Superior Dukes of the Northern League. He batted .298 with six home runs and 39 RBIs during the season. He signed with the Chicago White Sox to play the 1997 season with the Birmingham Barons during the 1998 season. He hit just .200 with 8 RBIs in 17 games.

Coaching career
From 1999 to 2003, Cardenas served as the head baseball coach at Colbert High School in Colbert, Oklahoma. Cardenas then served as the head baseball coach at Greenville High School in Greenville, Texas for two years.

In the summer of 2005, Cardenas accepted a position as an assistant coach for the Stephen F. Austin Lumberjacks baseball program. He was an assistant for 3 years, and was named the interim head coach when Donnie Watson's contract wasn't renewed.

On July 9, 2008, Cardenas was named the head coach of Stephen F. Austin. Following the 2010 season, Cardenas was named the Southland Conference Coach of the Year.

Head coaching record

See also
 List of current NCAA Division I baseball coaches

References

External links

Stephen F. Austin Lumberjacks bio

Living people
1970 births
Baseball catchers
Seward County Saints baseball players
TCU Horned Frogs baseball players
Bellingham Mariners players
Riverside Pilots players
Port City Roosters players
Oklahoma City 89ers players
Duluth-Superior Dukes players
Birmingham Barons players
High school baseball coaches in the United States
Stephen F. Austin Lumberjacks baseball coaches